Hiiragi (written: 柊) is a Japanese surname. Notable people with the surname include:

 (born 1962), Japanese manga artist
 (born 1987), Japanese actress

Fictional characters
Kagami (pigtails) and Tsukasa Hiiragi (short hair), their parents Miki and Tadao, and their sisters Inori and Matsuri, all from the manga series Lucky Star
Tenri Hiiragi (柊 天理)
Chisato Hiiragi, an NPC in Genshin Impact
Alice Hiiragi, a character from Persona 5 Strikers
The Hiiragi family from the novel series, Seraph of the End:
Kureto Hiiragi (柊 暮人)
Seishirou Hiiragi (柊 征志郎)
Mahiru Hiiragi (柊 真昼)
Shinya Hiiragi (柊 深夜)
Shinoa Hiiragi (柊 シノア)
Kappei Hiiragi from the visual novel Clannad
Akira Hiragi, a character from Valkyrie Drive
Yuzu Hiiragi, a character from the manga/anime series Yu-Gi-Oh! Arc-V, known as Zuzu Boyle in the dub.

Japanese-language surnames